Frank Gallen was a former Australian professional soccer player who played as a forward and as a selective for the Australia national soccer team in 1924. He is nicknamed Pocket Hercules.

Club career
From the start of the 1920s, Gallen joined Balmain Gladstone, where he was part of their squad who won a Premiership in 1921 and was promoted to the top-tier league in 1922. He left Balmain Gladstone halfway through the 1920s.

International career
Gallen began his international career with Australia on their six-match tour against Canada. He debuted in a 3–2 win over Canada on 7 June 1924. He was also selected as part of Australia XI's squad tour against the English FA touring side.

Career statistics

International

References

Australian soccer players
Association football defenders
Australia international soccer players